Mouthe is a commune in the Doubs department in the Bourgogne-Franche-Comté region in eastern France. The town is known for having the coldest recorded temperature in France.

Geography

Climate
Mouthe, is located in a region of the Jura Mountains known as "Little Siberia" (La Petite Sibérie) and snowfalls are not uncommon as late as the third week of March. Although the average low temperature for January in the town ranges from about -6 °C to -10 °C, the low temperature descended to -36.7 °C (-34.1 °F) on 13 January 1968, and fell further, to -41.2 °C (-42.2 °F) on 17 January 1985.

Summers are warm and winters are very cold and snowy and there is no dry season.

1981-2010 climate normals 

The village and its church served as the location for the film Nobody Else But You (2011).

Population

See also
 Communes of the Doubs department

References

External links

 Mouthe on the intercommunal Web site of the department 

Communes of Doubs